was a province of Japan in the area of northwestern Shikoku. Iyo bordered on Sanuki Province to the northeast, Awa to the east, and Tosa to the south. In terms of the Gokishichidō system, Iyo was one of the provinces of the Nankaidō circuit. Under the Engishiki classification system, Iyo was ranked as one of the "upper countries" (上国) in terms of importance, and one of the "far countries" (遠国) in terms of distance from the capital. The provincial capital was located in what is now the city of Imabari, but its exact location is still unknown. The ichinomiya of the province is the Ōyamazumi Shrine located on the island of Ōmishima in what is now part of Imabari. The people spoke Iyo dialect.

History
Iyo Province was formed by the Ritsuryo reforms by combining the territories of the ,who ruled a territory centered on what is now the city of Iyo and town of Masaki with Kumi Province, Kazehaya Province, Touma Province, and Koichi Province each ruled by its own kuni no miyatsuko. The Geiyo Islands in the Seto Inland Sea were considered part of Aki Province into the Edo Period. During the Heian period, the coastal areas of the province were part of the stronghold of  Fujiwara no Sumitomo, who led a rebellion against Imperial authority. During the Muromachi period, a branch of the Saionji family was appointed as shugo by the Ashikaga shogunate, but was constantly being invaded his more powerful and aggressive neighbors. The Saionji survived by the fluid loyalties and fierce resistance, but were eventually overcome by Chōsokabe Motochika, who was in turn overthrown by the forces of Toyotomi Hideyoshi.  Under the Tokugawa shogunate, the province was divided into several feudal domains.

Per the early Meiji period , an official government assessment of the nation’s resources, the province had 964 villages with a total kokudaka of 434,408 koku. Iyo Province consisted of the following districts:

Following the abolition of the han system in 1871, Iyo Province became Ehime Prefecture.

Gallery

Notes

References
 Nussbaum, Louis-Frédéric and Käthe Roth. (2005).  Japan encyclopedia. Cambridge: Harvard University Press. ;  OCLC 58053128

External links 

  Murdoch's map of provinces, 1903

Former provinces of Japan
Iyo Province
History of Ehime Prefecture
1871 disestablishments in Japan
States and territories disestablished in 1871